Randy Gene Palmer (born November 12, 1975) is a former American football tight end who played for the Cleveland Browns in 1999. He played college football at Texas A&M University–Kingsville.

References 

1975 births
Living people
American football tight ends
Texas A&M–Kingsville Javelinas football players
Cleveland Browns players